The Fix NICS Act of 2017 is a United States federal law passed as part of the Consolidated Appropriations Act, 2018 signed as Pub.L.115-141 by President Donald Trump on  March 23, 2018.  The law applies penalties to government agencies for not reporting to the National Instant Criminal Background Check System (NICS). It was introduced in the 115th United States Congress in the wake of the Sutherland Springs church shooting. It was ultimately passed as Division S, Title VI to the Consolidated Appropriations Act, 2018.

Provisions

House of Representatives
The House bill contains a provision requiring the United States Justice Department to report on the number of times a bump stock was used in a crime, but does not put any restrictions on bump stocks.

Senate
The Senate bill contains no provision on bump stocks. The Senate Judiciary Committee is scheduled on December 6, 2017, for a hearing on regulating bump stocks.

Legislative history

See also 
 Concealed Carry Reciprocity Act of 2017

References 

Proposed legislation of the 115th United States Congress
United States federal firearms legislation
Riders to United States federal appropriations legislation
Acts of the 115th United States Congress